Incite may refer to:

INCITE, formerly styled inCite, members' news magazine of the Australian Library and Information Association
Incite (band), American metal band
Incitement, a former offence under England and Wales law
Incite Pictures, a documentary film production company
Incite Productions, a documentary film production company

See also
 Insight (disambiguation)